Eucalyptus tenella, commonly known as narrow-leaved stringybark, is a species of small to medium-sized tree that is endemic to New South Wales.  It has stringy bark, narrow lance-shaped to linear leaves, flower buds in group of seven to fifteen, white flowers and hemispherical fruit.

Description
It has thick, fibrous, furrowed, stringy bark usually coloured grey over reddish brown. Flowering occurs from September to March and the flowers are white.

Taxonomy and naming
Eucalyptus tenella was first formally described in 1991 by Lawrie Johnson and Ken Hill in the journal Telopea from specimens Johnson collected near Capertee in 1968. The specific epithet (tenella) is from the Latin tenellus meaning "somewhat delicate", referring to the small leaves.

Distribution and habitat
Narrow-leaved stringybark grows in dry woodland in shallow soils between Rylstone and Nowra.

References

tenella
Myrtales of Australia
Flora of New South Wales
Trees of Australia
Plants described in 1991